The 2014 Portland Timbers season was the 4th season for the Portland Timbers in Major League Soccer (MLS), the top flight professional soccer league in the United States and Canada.

Background

The Timbers finished the 2013 season in 1st place in the Western Conference, however it wasn't until December 13, 2013 that it was announced they would be playing in the 2014-15 CONCACAF Champions League due to a rule change.  Replacing the MLS Cup runner-up, the top team in the non-Supporter Shield conference would get the spot in Champions League.

The Timbers announced they would be partnering with the San Jose Earthquakes and USL Pro team Sacramento Republic FC on January 23.  The Timbers will send 2 players on loan to Sacramento Republic and not participate in the MLS Reserve League.

Competitions

Major League Soccer

Preseason

Desert Friendlies

Rose City Invitational

MLS regular season

MLS Cup Playoffs

Western Conference standings

Updated to matches played on September 25, 2013 01:00 EDTSource: gue Soccer (MLS), the top flight MLSSoccer.com(W1) = Western Conference champion; (WC) = Qualifies for playoffs via wild-card. Only applicable when the season is not finished: (Q) = Qualified for the MLS Cup Playoffs, but not yet to the particular round indicated; (E) = Eliminated from playoff contention.

Overall standings

Results summary

Results by round

U.S. Open Cup

Cup bracket

2014–15 CONCACAF Champions League

Eight groups of 3 teams will be drawn, with each group containing at least one Mexican club and one American club.

Group 5

Cascadia Cup

The Cascadia Cup is a trophy that was created in 2004 by supporters of the Portland Timbers, Seattle Sounders FC and Vancouver Whitecaps FC. It is awarded to the club with the best record in league games versus the other participants.

Friendlies

Club

Kits

Executive staff

Coaching staff

Squad

Roster and Statistics

All players contracted to the club during the season included. Regular season stats updated on November 29, 2014.

Goalkeeper stats

Last updated: March 8, 2014

Player Recognition

Player movement

Transfers in

Loans in

Loans out

Transfers out

2013 MLS Re-Entry Draft Picks

2014 MLS SuperDraft Picks

Unsigned Trialists

Miscellaneous

International Roster Slots

References

2014
Portland Timbers
Portland Timbers
Portland Timbers
Port